Alaa Abdelnaby, (born June 24, 1968) is an Egyptian-American former professional basketball player. He played for the Duke Blue Devils and then played in the National Basketball Association (NBA) and Continental Basketball Association (CBA), among other leagues. Abdelnaby alongside Abdel Nader are the only players born in Egypt to play in the NBA.

Abdelnaby works as a basketball broadcaster and analyst for NBCS Philadelphia, CBS Sports Network, and Westwood One Radio.

Early life
Abdelnaby was born in Alexandria, Egypt, and moved to the United States with his family in 1971 at the age of two. His father was an engineer and his mother was a computer analyst who had moved to find better jobs. His family became American citizens.

Abelnaby was raised in Nutley and Bloomfield, New Jersey, and played on the Bloomfield High School basketball team. Abdelnaby was selected as a standout American high school athlete as both a McDonald's All-American and a Parade All-American.

College career
Abdelnaby played at Duke University from 1986 to 1990. He had a breakout year as a senior when he averaged 14.9 points and 6.7 rebounds during the regular season. Abndelnaby was a third-team all-Atlantic Coast Conference (ACC) selection as a senior. He had a series of widely publicized off-court problems during his early seasons including an accident where he drove his car into a tree on campus.

Abdelnaby commented on Duke University's academic requirements: "The only way I can make five A's is when I sign my name."

Professional career
Abdelnaby was selected by the Portland Trail Blazers of the National Basketball Association with the 25th pick of the 1990 NBA draft, and he spent five years in the league, playing for Portland as well as the Milwaukee Bucks, Boston Celtics, Philadelphia 76ers, and Sacramento Kings. He was signed by the Golden State Warriors but he never played for that franchise. 

After leaving the NBA, Abdelnaby played for the Papagou BC (Greece) (1995–1996), the Omaha Racers (CBA) (1996–1997), Olympique Antibes (France) (1997–1998), and the Idaho Stampede (CBA) (1999–2000).

Transactions
1990, June 27 – First round, 25th pick of the Portland Trail Blazers in the 1990 NBA draft
1992, July 1 – Traded for Milwaukee Bucks' rights to Tracy Murray
1992, December 4 – Traded for Boston Celtics' rights to Jon Barry
1994, July 26 – Free agent, signed by the Sacramento Kings
1995, March 21 – Released by the Sacramento Kings
1995, March 24 – Free agent, signed by the Philadelphia 76ers to a 10-day contract
1995, April 3 – Re-signed by the Philadelphia 76ers to a second 10-day contract
1995, April 12 – Released by the Philadelphia 76ers
1995, October 6 – Free agent, signed by the Golden State Warriors to a one-year contract
1995, October 18 – Released by the Golden State Warriors

NBA career statistics

Regular season

|-
| align="left" | 1990–91
| align="left" | Portland
| 43 || 0 || 6.7 || .474 || .000 || .568 || 2.1 || .3 || .1 || .3 || 3.1
|-
| align="left" | 1991–92
| align="left" | Portland
| 71 || 1 || 13.2 || .493 || .000 || .752 || 3.7 || .4 || .4 || .2 || 6.1
|-
| align="left" | 1992–93
| align="left" | Milwaukee
| 12 || 0 || 13.3 || .464 || .000 || .750 || 3.1 || .8 || .2 || .3 || 5.3
|-
| align="left" | 1992–93
| align="left" | Boston
| 63 || 52 || 18.3 || .525 || .000 || .760 || 4.8 || .3 || .3 || .4 || 8.2
|-
| align="left" | 1993–94
| align="left" | Boston
| 13 || 0 || 12.2 || .436 || .000 || .640 || 3.5 || .2 || .2 || .2 || 4.9
|-
| align="left" | 1994–95
| align="left" | Sacramento
| 51 || 0 || 9.3 || .532 || .000 || .571 || 2.1 || .3 || .3 || .2 || 5.0
|-
| align="left" | 1994–95
| align="left" | Philadelphia
| 3 || 0 || 10.0 || .091 || .000 || .000 || 2.7 || .0 || .0 || .0 || .7
|- class="sortbottom"
| style="text-align:center;" colspan="2"| Career
| 256 || 53 || 12.5 || .502 || .000 || .701 || 3.3 || .3 || .3 || .2 || 5.7
|}

Playoffs

|-
| align="left" | 1991
| align="left" | Portland
| 5 || 0 || 2.6 || .333 || .000 || .000 || .6 || .0 || .0 || .0 || .8
|-
| align="left" | 1992
| align="left" | Portland
| 8 || 0 || 3.1 || .500 || .000 || .500 || .5 || .3 || .0 || .0 || 1.5
|-
| align="left" | 1993
| align="left" | Boston
| 4 || 4 || 17.0 || .458 || .000 || .000 || 3.3 || .3 || .0 || .3 || 5.5
|- class="sortbottom"
| style="text-align:center;" colspan="2"| Career
| 17 || 4 || 6.2 || .450 || .000 || .500 || 1.2 || .2 || .0 || .1 || 2.2
|}

Broadcasting career
Abdelnaby was approached by the NBA to broadcast the 1995 NBA All-Star Game for an Arabic-language television network as he was the only Arabic speaker in the league. He began broadcasting with Orbit Satellite Television and later worked for other Arabic channels.

Abdelnaby serves as the color analyst for the Philadelphia 76ers, working alongside play-by-play commentator Kate Scott (NBC Sports Philadelphia). He is also a CBS Sports Network college basketball in-studio analyst and provides color commentary for on-site NCAA basketball games. Additionally, Abdelnaby does color commentary for Westwood One Radio.

Personal life
Abdelnaby is a Muslim.

References

External links
 Career statistics at Basketball-Reference.com
 Career statistics at dukeupdate.com
 Alaa Abdelnaby, TheDraftReview.com
 Morris, Ron. "Finding the range", Saudi Aramco World, April 1990
Alaa Abdelnaby at ESPN.com
Alaa Abdelnaby at Sports-Reference College Basketball
Alaa Abdelnaby at RealGM.com
Alaa Abdelnaby at NBA.com

1968 births
Living people
American men's basketball players
Basketball players from New Jersey
Bloomfield High School (New Jersey) alumni
Boston Celtics players
Centers (basketball)
College basketball announcers in the United States
Duke Blue Devils men's basketball players
Egyptian emigrants to the United States
Egyptian men's basketball players
Idaho Stampede (CBA) players
McDonald's High School All-Americans
Milwaukee Bucks players
National Basketball Association broadcasters
Olympique Antibes basketball players
Omaha Racers players
Papagou B.C. players
Parade High School All-Americans (boys' basketball)
People from Bloomfield, New Jersey
People from Nutley, New Jersey
Philadelphia 76ers players
Portland Trail Blazers draft picks
Portland Trail Blazers players
Power forwards (basketball)
Sacramento Kings players
Sportspeople from Alexandria
Sportspeople from Essex County, New Jersey
American Muslims